River Chakan is a left bank tributary of Chambal River. The river flows in a south-easterly direction and joins river Chambal in Sawai Madhopur District. The catchment area of Chakan river extends over Sawai Madhopur, Tonk, Bundi and Kota Districts.

References

Chambal River
Sawai Madhopur district